The 1962 FIVB Men's World Championship was the fifth edition of the tournament, organised by the world's governing body, the FIVB. It was held from 12 to 26 October 1962 in Soviet Union.

Teams
No qualifications, free entrance.

Pool A
 
 
 
  (withdrew)
 

Pool B
 
 
 
 
 

Pool C
 
 
 
 

Pool D
 
 
  (Host)
 

Pool E
 
 
 
  (withdrew)

Results

First round

Pool A
Location: Riga

|}

|}

Pool B
Location: Leningrad

|}

|}

Pool C
Location: Kiev

|}

|}

Pool D
Location: Moscow

|}

|}

Pool E
Location: Moscow

|}

|}

Final round
The results and the points of the matches between the same teams that were already played during the first round are taken into account for the final round.

11th–20th places
Location: Kiev

|}

|}

|}

|}

|}

|}

|}

|}

|}

Final places

|}

|}

|}

|}

|}

|}

|}

|}

|}

Final standing

External links
 Results at FIVB.org
 Federation Internationale de Volleyball

FIVB Men's World Championship
FIVB Men's World Championship
Sports competitions in Moscow
FIVB Volleyball Men's World Championship
International volleyball competitions hosted by the Soviet Union
FIVB Men's World Championship